Essex Township may refer to the following places in the United States:

 Essex Township, Kankakee County, Illinois
 Essex Township, Stark County, Illinois
 Essex Township, Michigan

Township name disambiguation pages